Trails on Long Island include more than  of paved and unpaved trails for mountain bikers and road cyclists. The New York Times has reported that "for bikers the lure of Long Island is unsurpassed."

One Long Island-based bicycle club, Concerned Long Island Mountain Bicyclists, also known as CLIMB, built a legal mountain bike trail network in New York City in Queens’ Cunningham Park. In 2007 the New York State Department of Transportation completed Long Island's first long-distance signed bike route from Cold Spring Harbor to the Orient Point ferry terminal.

References

External links
 Additional trails around Long Island
 Bike Around Long Island
 CLIMB (Concerned Long Island Mountain Bicyclists)
 East End Cycling Team
 Gbsc/Carl Hart Bicycle Racing Team
 Bicycle Club
 Long Island Bicycle Club
 Massapequa Park Bicycle Club
 Paumonok Bicycling Of Long Island
 Shoreham Bmx Parents Association
 Suffolk Bicycle Riders Association

Long
Long
 
Mountain biking venues in the United States
Tourist attractions on Long Island
Transportation on Long Island
New York, Long Island
New York (state) transportation-related lists